The New Alternative Party is a political party in Thailand founded on March 2, 2018 by Rachen Tagunviang who is the party's chairman and Pairoj Kathumtongles who is its secretary-general. The party is based in Nonthaburi Province.

References

External links 

Political parties in Thailand
Political parties established in 2018